Justin Bozung is an American biographer, author, and editor of several cinema books and articles.

Career 
Bozung has written for Fangoria, Shock Cinema, Paracinema, and Phantom of the Movies' Videoscope. He was the co-creator of The Projection Booth Podcast with Mike White and served as the editor of the Mondo Film & Video Guide from 2010 until 2012.

He sits on the board of the Norman Mailer Society, serves as part-time archivist for Project Mailer, and is the host of the Norman Mailer Society Podcast.

He has contributed to two books on Stanley Kubrick including Stanley Kubrick's The Shining: Studies in the Horror Film, and is the editor of The Cinema of Norman Mailer: Film is Like Death. Bozung is also the official biographer of filmmaker Frank Perry.

Personal life 
He currently lives in Atlanta, Georgia with his wife, Lindsey.

Bibliography 
(2015) Stanley Kubrick's The Shining: Studies in the Horror Film, Ed. Danel Olson, Centipede Press, Lakewood, Colorado, pages 335-665, .
(2015) Last Summer: Take Two in Movie Outlaw Vol. 1, Ed. Mike Watt, Createspace Independent Publishing, Seattle, pages 295-96,  .
(2015) The American Antonioni, in The Mailer Review, Volume 9, 2015, Ed. Phillip Sipiora, University of South Florida Press, .
(2016) Norman Mailer's Dark Forces, in The Mailer Review, Volume 10, 2016, Ed. Phillip Sipiora, University of South Florida Press, .
(2017) The Cinema of Norman Mailer: Film is Like Death, Bloomsbury, New York, .
(2018) Mailer De Facto: How Norman Mailer Saved Barney Rosset, in The Mailer Review, Volume 12, 2018, Ed. Phillip Sipiora, University of South Florida Press, .
(2021) Norman Mailer in Context, Ed. Maggie McKinley, Cambridge University Press, pages 91–101,

References 

Living people
American biographers
1977 births